Russia defaulted on part of its foreign currency denominated debt on June 27, 2022 (because the money got stuck in Euroclear), its first such default since 1918 (in 1998 it was ruble-denominated bonds). Before that, on 2 June, Russia defaulted on the 30-day interest, incorrectly not counting interest for the grace period, but a failure to pay $1.9 million was not sufficient to trigger a cross-default across other instruments, because the minimum threshold is an amount of at least $75 million, according to documents for other Russian eurobonds.

Background

The United States Treasury Department in February 2022 moved to cut off Russia from the global economy after the 2022 Russian invasion of Ukraine, announcing that it would immobilize Russian central bank assets that are held in the United States and impose sanctions on the Russian Direct Investment Fund. The $284 billion or more in frozen assets is nearly half of the $585 billion that Russia had stockpiled as of June 2021.

The Biden administration initially allowed Russia to continue to repurpose the substantial funds it has kept in U.S. financial institutions to make required payments on its sovereign debt. But on April 4, the Treasury Department banned Russia from withdrawing funds held in US banks to pay off its debt obligations.

On 4 April 2022, Russia technically defaulted on its foreign debt by failing to pay its obligations in US dollars (and after the grace period it actually defaulted because it did not pay 30 days grace period interest of around 1.9 million USD). On 8 April, the credit agency S&P Global predicted that Russia will inevitably be in "selective default on foreign currency obligations" (NR rating after CC rating) because it tried to pay obligations on dollar denominated debt in rubles, which could not be converted into "dollars equivalent to the originally due amounts", since every government can just "print money" in the currency it controls (no money is actually printed, i.e. the US can create new virtual money in USD, since the Federal Reserve can purchase federal US Treasury bonds, banks can then draw on the reserve, so more money is "created"). A selective default occurs if a borrower defaults on specific (foreign, or more accurately, "foreign currency") obligations but not all of its debt.

Two dollar denominated bonds issued by the Russian government matured on 4 April 2022. On 5 April, Russia attempted to pay its bondholders with dollars from $600 million of reserves held in US banks, but these were blocked by the US as part of the sanctions against Russia for its invasion of Ukraine.

The Russian government had a 30-day grace period to meet its contractual obligations, but S&P Global stated that it expects that investors will not be able to convert rubles into “dollars equivalent to the originally due amounts” and sanctions will reduce Russia's "willingness and technical abilities to honor the terms and conditions" of the loans.

Previously, on 16 March, Russia managed to pay through a new method (acting on a general license issued by the US Office of Foreign Assets Control, which was valid until May 25) and thus avoided technical default, it also threatened to sue if forced into default or use cryptocurrency.

Earlier, Russian Minister of Finance Anton Siluanov said that Russia would repay its foreign currency debt only if its foreign currency accounts were unfrozen. On 29 April, Russia's Finance Ministry said that it made an attempt to repay US$649.2 million on Russia-2022 and Russia-2042 Eurobonds (in dollars through non-sanctioned  to Bank of New York Mellon Corp. and then to Citibank N.A., London branch), but it was not clear if the payments would reach the recipients and Russia would avoid default. On 4 May, US and UK regulators cleared the payments with a technical date of 2 May.

Five days before the May 25 license expired, Russia again managed to pay on Russia-2026 and Russia-2036 Eurobonds but did not avoid falling into the grace period, because its money got stuck in Euroclear (that was classified as an actual default by Moody's 30 days later on 27 June). It paid US$71.25 million for a dollar-denominated eurobond and 26.5 million euros ($28 million) for euro-denominated notes. The next payments after the due on 27 May one were $235 million across two Eurobonds due on June 23.

The 30-day grace period still required interest to be paid, so at the end of May the money paid on 29 April (and got into Citibank N.A. on 2 May) was about 1.9 million USD short, and the technical default from 4 April was converted into a real default, as recognized when 13 members  of the Credit Derivatives Determinations Committee for Europe voted on 1 June, only one of them (Citibank N.A.) voting in favour of Russia.

A default for the purposes of CDS contracts "occurs once the determination committee votes for a credit event, which has now happened," said Gabriele Foa, portfolio manager of the Global Credit Opportunities Fund at Algebris. "Of course…it is a very small amount, so the definition of default is very technical. If, as it seems, it is not possible for foreign investors to receive dollars starting May 25, the default will soon be more material."

Finance Minister Anton Siluanov dismissed the default status as a "farce", since Russia has plenty of dollar and euro funds to repay the debt. Associated Press reported that the official default on Russian's foreign debt would take time to be confirmed. Financial analysts described Russia's situation as unique, since it has extensive amounts of cash to fulfill its debt obligations and very small foreign debt compared to USA.

Russian default on foreign debt

On Monday 27 June 2022, Moody's rating agency declared that Russia defaulted on its foreign debt after missing a payment deadline the preceding Sunday.

See also

References

2020s economic history
2020s in Russia
Economic history of Russia
Financial crises
Russia
Russia
debt
debt